The Interton Video 2000 is a dedicated first-generation home video game console released in 1975 by Interton in Germany. The console turns itself on automatically when a cartridge is inserted. This console was also one of the first cartridge-based consoles ever released in Europe. The cartridges do not contain game programs, but simply activate internal parts of the system when inserted.

The Interton Video 2000 contains 14 CMOS chips, making it relatively advanced for its time. It was followed by the Interton Video 2400 in 1975 and the Interton Video 2501 in 1977.

Games 

Only five games were released for the system in form of cartridges:

Sparring
Badminton
Attacke
Tennis (Pong clone)
Super Tennis

These are not ROM cartridges. Each contains just a few wires that electrically connect a few parts of the internal console hardware so that a game appears on the screen.

On the box art for the console, two games were shown which were never released: Car Race and Naval Battle.

Clones 
A clone of the Interton Video 2000 called Tele-Tenis was made only in Spain.

References 

Dedicated consoles
First-generation video game consoles
Home video game consoles
1970s toys